Tripyla is a genus of Nematoda belonging to the family Tripylidae.

The genus was described in 1865 by Henry Charlton Bastian.

The genus has cosmopolitan distribution.

Species:
 Tripyla setifera Bütschli, 1873
 Tripyla sibirica Gagarin, 1993
 Tripyla subterranea Tsalolikhin, 1976
 Tripyla tenuis Brzeski, 1964
 Tripyla terricola Brzeski & Winiszewska-Slipinska, 1993
 Tripyla triloboides Rahm, 1932
 Tripyla vulvata Andrássy, 1977

References

Nematodes